Đức Phổ is a district-level town (thị xã) of Quảng Ngãi province in the South Central Coast region of Vietnam. As of 2019 the town had a population of 150,927. The town covers an area of 372.76 km². The town capital lies at Nguyễn Nghiêm ward.

References

Districts of Quảng Ngãi province
County-level towns in Vietnam